The Siberian Route (Sibirsky trakt), also known as the Moscow Highway (Московский тракт) and Great Highway (Большой тракт), was a historic route that connected European Russia to Siberia and China.

History

The construction of the road was decreed by the Tsar
and was not finished until the mid-19th century. Previously, Siberian transport had been mostly by river via Siberian River Routes. The first Russian settlers arrived in Siberia by the Cherdyn river route which was superseded by the Babinov overland route in the late 1590s. The town of Verkhoturye in the Urals was the most eastern point of the Babinov Road.

The much longer Siberian route started in Moscow as the Vladimir Highway and passed through Murom, Kozmodemyansk, Kazan, Perm, Kungur, Yekaterinburg, Tyumen, Tobolsk, Tara, Kainsk, Tomsk, Yeniseysk and Irkutsk. After crossing Lake Baikal the road split near Verkhneudinsk. One branch continued east to Nerchinsk while the other went south to the border post of Kyakhta where it linked to camel caravans that crossed Mongolia to a Great Wall gate at Kalgan.

In the early 19th century, the route was moved to the south. From Tyumen the road proceeded through Yalutorovsk, Ishim, Omsk, Tomsk, Achinsk and Krasnoyarsk before rejoining the older route at Irkutsk. It remained a vital artery connecting Siberia with Moscow and Europe until the last decades of the 19th century, when it was superseded by the Trans-Siberian Railway and Amur Cart Road. The automobile equivalent is the Trans-Siberian Highway.

Etymology and legacy of name
The Siberian Route was also known as the Tea Road, owing to the great quantities of tea that were transported from China to Europe through Siberia. Charles Wenyon, who passed by the "Great Post Road" in 1893, subscribed to the popular belief that "the best tea produced in China goes to Russia".

In 1915, China exported to Siberia 70,297 tons of tea, which accounted for 65% of the country's overall tea exports. The route is the namesake of the Russian Caravan blend of tea.

It was imported primarily in the form of hefty hard-packed tea bricks which allowed each camel to carry large quantities in a more compact manner and could also pass for units of currency. From Kyakhta, tea was transported to the Irbit fair for further commercial transactions.  Another popular Chinese import item was dried rhubarb root, which was sold west of St. Petersburg "for fifteen times what it cost in Kyakhta".

See also

 Tea in Russia
 Kyakhta Russian-Chinese Pidgin

References

Further reading
 Avery, Martha. The Tea Road: China and Russia Meet Across the Steppe. Mandarin Books, 2003. .
 Alexander Michie, 'The Siberian Overland Route from Peking to Petersburg', 1864. -followed the route in 1863

Roads in Russia
Roads in Siberia
History of Siberia
Economic history of Russia
Russian Empire
1689 establishments in Russia
China–Russian Empire relations
Historical roads